Not Cool may refer to:

 Not Cool, a 2013 album by Tim Easton
 Not Cool, a 2014 book by Greg Gutfeld
 Not Cool (film), a 2014 film directed by and featuring Shane Dawson